Sookmyung Women's University Station is subway station 427, on the Seoul Subway Line 4 in Yongsan-gu, Seoul. It is also called Garwol station (갈월역). It is located in front of the main entrance of the Sookmyung Women's University. There are many restaurants in the neighborhood of the subway station.

Though not connected by transfer, Sookmyung Women's University Station is only a two- to three-minute walk from Namyeong station on Line 1.

Station layout

References

Seoul Metropolitan Subway stations
Metro stations in Yongsan District
Railway stations in South Korea opened in 1985
Railway stations at university and college campuses
Sookmyung Women's University